Prehensility is the quality of an appendage or organ that has adapted for grasping or holding. The word is derived from the Latin term prehendere, meaning "to grasp". The ability to grasp is likely derived from a number of different origins. The most common are tree-climbing and the need to manipulate food.

Examples

Appendages that can become prehensile include:

Uses
Prehensility affords animals a great natural advantage in manipulating their environment for feeding, climbing, digging, and defense. It enables many animals, such as primates, to use tools to complete tasks that would otherwise be impossible without highly specialized anatomy. For example, chimpanzees have the ability to use sticks to obtain termites and grubs in a manner similar to human fishing. However, not all prehensile organs are applied to tool use; the giraffe tongue, for instance, is instead used in feeding and self-cleaning.

References

Animal anatomy